Rocío from La Mancha is a 1963 Spanish musical film directed by Luis Lucia and starring Rocío Dúrcal.

Plot
A car accident changes an orphan's life as she becomes the legal guardian of her four brothers.  She meets a woman who sets to return to her husband who is in Paris by asking Rocio to pretend that she is Isabel (the woman's daughter).  The father (Carlos Estrada) hasn't seen her in 13 years and doesn't know that the real Isabel is dead.

Cast
 Rocío Dúrcal	
 Carlos Estrada
 Helga Liné
 Roberto Camardiel
 Carmen Lozano
 Simón Andreu
 José María Caffarel

Soundtrack

External links
 

1963 films
1960s Spanish-language films
1963 musical films
Films directed by Luis Lucia
Spanish musical films
Films scored by Augusto Algueró
1960s Spanish films